Jacky Peeters (Dutch pronunciation: [ˈɟɛki ˈpeːtərs]) (born 13 December 1969) is a Belgian retired professional footballer who played as a defender.

Club career 
Peeters joined K.R.C Genk in 1994, where he stayed until 1998. His last game with Genk was a 4–0 win against Brugge to see the team win the Cup Final. He scored the fourth goal. Peeters then joined 2. Bundesliga club Arminia Bielefeld, where he achieved promotion to Bundesliga. He then returned to Belgium to join K.A.A Gent, a first division team in Belgium.

International career 
Peeters played for Belgium national team, playing at the Euro 2000 and the 2002 World Cup. His first international game was against the Netherlands on 4 September 1999, a 5–5 draw. One of the highlights of his career was playing for Belgium during the 2002 World Cup in Japan and Korea. Most memorable was the game against Brazil, where he assisted a goal by the captain Marc Willmots, which was not counted at the time, but later considered a legal goal. His last game with the Red Devils was a friendly match against Poland on 21 August 2002. Altogether, he played 17 matches for the Belgium national team.

Honours

Player
Genk
 Belgian Cup: 1997–98

Arminia Bielefeld
 2. Bundesliga: 1998–99

Belgium
 FIFA Fair Play Trophy: 2002 World Cup

References

External links 
 
 

1969 births
Living people
Belgian footballers
Belgium international footballers
Belgian expatriate footballers
Flemish sportspeople
Association football central defenders
Belgian Pro League players
K.A.A. Gent players
K.R.C. Genk players
Arminia Bielefeld players
Bundesliga players
2. Bundesliga players
K. Patro Eisden Maasmechelen players
UEFA Euro 2000 players
2002 FIFA World Cup players
Expatriate footballers in Germany
Belgian football managers
K. Patro Eisden Maasmechelen managers
Association football defenders